Doug Parker may refer to:

 Doug Parker, chief executive officer of US Airways
 Doug Parker (voice actor), voice actor
 Douglas Parker, playwright
 Douglas H. Parker (born 1926), former law school professor
 Chief Parker, fictional DC Comics character, appears in stories featuring the original Superboy